John Samuel "Holly" Hollingshead (January 17, 1853 – October 6, 1926) was a Major League Baseball center fielder, second baseman, and manager in the 19th century.

Hollingshead played for the Washington Nationals of the National Association in 1872 and 1875, and also for the Washington Blue Legs in 1873.  In 58 total games played he batted .264 with 33 runs batted in and 45 runs scored.

He was also a manager for the Nationals for part of the 1875 season, guiding them to a record of 4-16.  Outfielder/pitcher Bill Parks took over the managerial duties for the last eight games and the team went 1-7.  Hollingshead also managed the Washington Nationals of the American Association in 1884.  Their record was 12-50.

Hollingshead died in his hometown of Washington, D.C. at the age of 73.

References

External links

Major League Baseball center fielders
Major League Baseball second basemen
Washington Nationals (NABBP) players
Washington Olympics (NABBP) players
Washington Nationals (NA) players
Washington Blue Legs players
Baseball player-managers
Baseball players from Washington, D.C.
19th-century baseball players
1853 births
1926 deaths
Washington Nationals (minor league) players